The 1968–69 season was Blackpool F.C.'s 61st season (58th consecutive) in the Football League. They competed in the 22-team Division Two, then the second tier of English football, finishing eighth.

Alan Suddick was the club's top scorer for the second consecutive season, with fourteen goals (twelve in the league and two in the League Cup).

Table

Notes

References

External links
The Blackpool squad photograph taken prior to the start of the season

Blackpool F.C.
Blackpool F.C. seasons